Verkhneye Gribtsovo is a rural locality (a village) in Parfyonovskoye Rural Settlement, Velikoustyugsky District, Vologda Oblast, Russia. The population was 18 as of 2002.

Geography 
Verkhneye Gribtsovo is located 17 km south of Veliky Ustyug (the district's administrative centre) by road. Karasovo is the nearest rural locality.

References 

Rural localities in Velikoustyugsky District